Elathi is a Tamil poetic work of didactic nature belonging to the Eighteen Lesser Texts (Pathinenkilkanakku) anthology of Tamil literature. This belongs to the 'post Sangam period' corresponding to between 100 and 500 CE. Elathi contains 80 poems written by the poet Kani Methaviyar. The poems of Elathi are written in the Venpa meter.

Elathi uses the analogy of the traditional herbal medicine known as elathi which uses six herbs such as elam (cardamom), ilavanka pattai (cinnamon), naagakesaram (made from the stamens of the Ceylon ironwood), milagu (black pepper), thippili (long pepper), and sukku (dried ginger). Elathi similarly uses six different maxims to illustrate correct behaviour. It tells about six values of every aspect of life in every poem in four lines.

The following poem lists the six things, namely, fame, wealth, praise, courage, education and philanthropy that add beauty to those who follow the scriptures.

References
 Mudaliyar, Singaravelu A., Apithana Cintamani, An encyclopaedia of Tamil Literature, (1931) - Reprinted by Asian Educational Services, New Delhi (1983)

Sangam literature